Salem Methodist Episcopal Church and Parsonage (also known as Salem United Methodist Church; Salem Methodist Church) is a historic church and parsonage at 810 York Street in Newport, Kentucky.

The church was founded by the German-born pastor John George Schaal (1844–1949).

It was built in 1882. In 1986, the church lost its steeple to a tornado, and the congregation then merged with Grace Methodist Episcopal Church, also in Newport. The building was sold to a performing arts organization, and currently is the venue of Stained Glass Theatre.

The church was added to the National Register of Historic Places in 1986. The structure is a contributing property to the York Street Historic District.

References

United Methodist churches in Kentucky
Churches on the National Register of Historic Places in Kentucky
Queen Anne architecture in Kentucky
Gothic Revival church buildings in Kentucky
Churches completed in 1882
19th-century Methodist church buildings in the United States
Churches in Campbell County, Kentucky
Samuel Hannaford church buildings
National Register of Historic Places in Campbell County, Kentucky
1882 establishments in Kentucky
Newport, Kentucky
Theatres in Kentucky
Clergy houses in the United States
German-American culture in Kentucky
Individually listed contributing properties to historic districts on the National Register in Kentucky